Jean Michelin (1616–1670) was a French Protestant painter. Michelin started out in his career as primarily a bamboccianti painter. He later branched out into religious themed paintings. One of his notable pieces was a depiction of the Adoration of the Shepherds, which currently resides in The Louvre.

References

17th-century French painters
French male painters
French Protestants
1616 births
1670 deaths